Douglas Errol Dreyfus Adecer (born December 20, 1999) is a Filipino-Australian actor, singer and host. He was the "Ultimate Male Survivor" (male winner) of the sixth season (2015) of the talent competition show StarStruck. He has since appeared on several of GMA's teleseryes.

Early life
Douglas Errol Dreyfus Adecer was born on December 20, 1999 in Bacolod, Philippines, and was raised in Sydney, Australia. He has three siblings and his parents are administration customer associates for an insurance company in Australia. His mother is from Mansilingan, Bacolod City while his father originally hailed from Cagayan de Oro.

Career

Acting career
In 2012, Adecer became a part of Glee CLUB Australia. Adecer was discovered and currently being managed by Kuh Ledesma who encouraged him to audition for StarStruck.

In 2015, Adecer joined the sixth season of the reality show StarStruck. Adecer was named the "Ultimate Male Survivor" and was proclaimed the "Ultimate Survivors" with Klea Pineda. They both received ₱ 1,000,000 cash prize, a house and lot from Camella Homes and a 5-year contract. Adecer and Pineda were also announced to join the cast of the 2016 retelling-sequel of Encantadia.

In 2016, Adecer portrayed as Anthony in Encantadia. Adecer portrayed Yuan in the Philippine adaptation of My Love from the Star.

Music career
In 2016, Adecer signed an album contract with GMA Records (now GMA Music).

Personal life
When he was in Australia, Adecer was a working student and dreamed of becoming a dentist or pilot. He is a fan of singer Sarah Geronimo and actor Aga Muhlach.

In April 2021,  he returned to Australia to finish his studies and spend time with his family. On December 30, 2021, he married Katrina Mercado.

Controversies
On March 26, 2019, Adecer was arrested by police in Makati after hitting two Metro Manila Development Authority (MMDA) employees while driving and then hitting a police car during his attempt to flee. Police reported that the actor was drunk, unruly, and refused to surrender his driver's license. He was charged for reckless imprudence resulting in physical injuries and damage to properties and disobedience to a person in authority. He later apologized and offered to shoulder the victims' medical expenses. The two victims eventually forgave him.

Filmography

Television

Drama

Reality, variety and talk shows

Accolades

References

External links
 
 Sparkle profile

Living people
21st-century Filipino male singers
Filipino male television actors
1999 births
Musicians from Sydney
People from Bacolod
Singers from Negros Occidental
People from Mandaluyong
Hiligaynon people
English-language singers from the Philippines
Participants in Philippine reality television series
StarStruck (Philippine TV series) winners
Reality show winners
GMA Network personalities
GMA Music artists
Filipino television personalities
Filipino television presenters
Filipino television variety show hosts